Novomykolaivka (Ukrainian: Новомиколаївка) is a village in Mykolaiv Raion of the Mykolaiv Oblast. It belongs to Pervomaiske settlement hromada, one of the hromadas of Ukraine.

Until 18 July 2020, Novomykolaivka belonged to Vitovka Raion. The raion was abolished in July 2020 as part of the administrative reform of Ukraine, which reduced the number of raions of Mykolaiv Oblast to four. The area of Vitovka Raion was merged into Mykolaiv Raion.

Language 
Distribution of population by native language according to the 2001 census:

References

Villages in Mykolaiv Raion, Mykolaiv Oblast